Socarenam (acronym: Société Calaisienne de Réparation Navale et Mécanique) is a French employee-owned shipbuilding company that operates shipyards in multiple ports in northern and western of the country.

History
Socarenam was founded in Calais in 1961 by Société Navale Caeannaise for repair and maintenance of its commercial fleet.

In 1969, the company established a new shipyard on the former site of Les chantiers BAHEUX in Boulogne-sur-Mer, a famous riveted steel fishing vessels shipbuilder that was created at the end of 19th century and had previously moved its headquarters to Boulogne. Socarenam opened its third workshop in Dunkirk in 1973 because of the company's tremendous workload.

In 1989, the parent company decided to spin off some subsidiaries, including Socarenam. At this point, the shipyard employees decided to take over a 100% stake in Socarenam, which finally meant that the employees managed to acquire their shipyard.

The company has been contracted by the Direction générale de l'Armement to build the Confiance class and the Patrouilleur Outre-mer ships.

References

External links
 

Manufacturing companies established in 1961
Privately held companies of France
French boat builders
Shipbuilding companies of France
Manufacturing companies of France
Military vehicle manufacturers
Defence companies of France
French companies established in 1961